The Pilbeam MP93, and its direct evolution, the Pilbeam MP100, are sports prototype race cars, designed, developed, and built by British manufacturer Pilbeam, for sports car racing, conforming to LMP2 class rules and regulations, and produced between 2005 and 2014. It is an evolution of the previous MP84.

References

Sports prototypes
Le Mans Prototypes